Max-Löbner-Straße is one of the 6 stations on the Bad Godesberg, Germany branch of Cologne Stadtbahn line 16 and the Bonn Stadtbahn all-day line 63 and peak hour line 67.

Cologne-Bonn Stadtbahn stations